Colaspis cruriflava is a species of leaf beetle found in the state of Arizona in the United States. It was first described by the American entomologist Doris Holmes Blake in 1977. The specific name, cruriflava, is derived from the Latin for "leg yellow".

References

Further reading

 

Eumolpinae
Articles created by Qbugbot
Taxa named by Doris Holmes Blake
Beetles described in 1977
Beetles of the United States